Orignal was a 62-gun  of the French Navy, built by R.N. Levasseur. Her keel was laid down in March 1749 and she was launched in Quebec on 2 September 1750.

Originally built as a 62-gun ship, she was intended to be upgraded to 72 guns. Built with poor quality timber, she broke in two halves and sank at her launch on 2 September 1750

References

Citations

Sources

 Rénald Lessard, "Construction navale royale à Québec, 1739-1759: des navires et des hommes" in L'Ancêtre, n°308, volume 41, pp. 63–65, autumn 2014

New France
1750 ships
Ships built in Quebec
Ships of the line of the French Navy
Maritime incidents in 1750